The 2008 Caribbean Cup (known as the Digicel Caribbean Cup for sponsorship reasons) is the 2008 edition of the Caribbean Championship, an international football championship for national teams affiliated with the Caribbean Football Union (CFU) of the CONCACAF region. The finals were held in Jamaica from 3–14 December 2008. The four semifinalists – Jamaica, Grenada, Guadeloupe, and Cuba – all qualified for the 2009 edition of the CONCACAF Gold Cup, although Cuba later withdrew and was replaced by Haiti.

Qualifying began in July 2008. The qualifying rounds were used to qualify a total of six teams to the final round of the tournament to join the hosts, Jamaica, and the reigning champions, Haiti, who were given direct entry to the final group stage. The name was changed this year from Digicel Caribbean Cup to Digicel Caribbean Championship.

Qualification

Group stage

Played in Jamaica from 3–14 December.

 and  automatically qualified for this round.

Group I

Group J

Knockout phase

Semi-finals

Third Place Playoff

Final

Goalscorers
Goals only from the final tournament
5 goals

 Kitson Bain
 Luton Shelton

3 goals

 Riviere Williams
 Roberto Linares
 Peter Byers
 Errol McFarlane

2 goals

 Yenier Márquez
 Ricky Charles
 Mickaël Antoine-Curier
 Alexandre Boucicaut
 Eric Vernan
 Devon Jorsling

1 goal

 Gregory Goodridge
 Jaime Colomé
 Joel Colomé
 Reysandry Fernandez
 Marcus Julien
 Gregory Gendrey
 Lery Hannany
 Jean-Luc Lambourde
 Michaël Niçoise
 Raymond Ednerson
 Sony Norde
 Rudolph Austin
 Demar Phillips
 Oneil Thompson
 Andy Williams
 Dwayne Leo

References

External links
 Caribbean Championships official site
 CONCACAF Gold Cup site
 CONCACAF competition results site

 
2008
2008
2007–08 in Caribbean football
2007–08 in Jamaican football